Statistics of DPR Korea Football League in the 2005 season.

Overview
Pyongyang City Sports Club won the championship, their second in a row.

References

DPR Korea Football League seasons
1
Korea
Korea